Nikki T. Randall (born June 3, 1972) is a Democratic member of the Georgia House of Representatives, representing the 138th district since a special election on November 2, 1999. She is currently Minority Caucus Vice Chairman.

External links
Georgia General Assembly - Representative Nikki Randall official GA House website
Project Vote Smart - Representative Nikki T. Randall (GA) profile
Follow the Money - Nikki Randall
2006 2004 2002 2000 campaign contributions

Members of the Georgia House of Representatives
1972 births
Living people
Tennessee State University alumni
Women state legislators in Georgia (U.S. state)
21st-century American politicians
21st-century American women politicians